Sarcofagus was one of the first heavy metal bands from Finland . With the album Moottorilinnut, released under the moniker Kimmo Kuusniemi Band, they became the first metal band to sing in Finnish.

Sarcofagus ( Sarcophagus LTD ) was founded in 1977. The band's front-man Kimmo Kuusniemi stated in the documentary film Promised Land Of Heavy Metal that Finland in the early 1980s was not prepared for heavy metal. For Moottorilinnut the band was forced to use the name Kimmo Kuusniemi Band, because they were not allowed to use the name Sarcophagus.

After Sarcofagus broke up, Kimmo started to work as a professional filmmaker. He has produced and directed hundreds of international films from TV commercials to music videos, from Vader to Madonna. He also composed movie soundtracks.

Discography

 Cycle of Life   (1980, JP-Music)
 Envoy of Death   (1980, JP-Music)
 Moottorilinnut   (1982, published in the name of Kimmo Kuusniemi Band below)
 Motorbirds Web Edition   (2004, self-released)
 Core Values   (2007, Rockadillo)

References

Finnish musical groups